Kermit Douglas Johnson, USA (September 2, 1928 – January 9, 2020) was an American Army chaplain who served as the 15th Chief of Chaplains of the United States Army from 1979 to 1982.

Awards and decorations

Gallery

References

Further reading

1928 births
2020 deaths
United States Army generals
Chiefs of Chaplains of the United States Army
United States Army personnel of the Korean War
Korean War chaplains
United States Army personnel of the Vietnam War
Vietnam War chaplains
Deputy Chiefs of Chaplains of the United States Army
Recipients of the Distinguished Service Medal (US Army)
Recipients of the Legion of Merit
Military personnel from Minneapolis
United States Military Academy alumni
20th-century American clergy
Burials at Arlington National Cemetery